The Cambridge Tribune was a weekly newspaper published in Cambridge, Massachusetts from 1878 to 1966. It was founded by D. Gilbert Dexter and began publication on March 7, 1878, from offices at Brattle Square in Old Cambridge. In 1885 Dexter sold the paper to William Bailey Howland. It ceased publication in 1966.

References

External links
 Online archives from the Cambridge Public Library

Overview from the Library of Congress

Companies based in Cambridge, Massachusetts
Defunct newspapers published in Massachusetts
Defunct companies based in Massachusetts
Newspapers published in Massachusetts
Publications established in 1878
Publications disestablished in 1966